Sarah Gronert (born 6 July 1986) is a German former professional tennis player. She won a total of ten titles on the ITF Women's Circuit in her career and her best WTA ranking of 164 came on 14 May 2012.

Intersex condition
Gronert was born intersex, with both male and female genitalia. She had surgery at the age of 19 and is legally and competitively considered to be a woman.

ITF finals

Singles (9–5)

Doubles (1–0)

References

External links
 
 

1986 births
Living people
People from Düren (district)
Sportspeople from Cologne (region)
German female tennis players
Tennis people from North Rhine-Westphalia
Intersex sportspeople
Intersex women